Roy Pagno (born 5 November 1969) is a retired Swiss football midfielder.

References

1969 births
Living people
Swiss men's footballers
FC St. Gallen players
FC Schaffhausen players
FC Chur players
Association football midfielders
Swiss Super League players